The Geomunoreum Lava Tube System is located between Seonheul-ri, Jocheon-eup and Weoljeong-ri, Gujwa-eup, Jeju City, Jeju-do. This lava tube system refers to a series of lava tubes formed by multiple ancient eruptions of basaltic lava flow from the Geomunoreum volcano (elevation 456m.) The flows followed a north-northeast direction for about 13km, going down to the coastline. It is estimated that the tube system formed between about 100 and 300 thousand years ago.

Lava tubes so far included in the Geomunoreum Lava Tube System are the Seonheul Vertical Cave, Bengdwigul Lava Tube, Bukoreumdonggul Lava Tube, Daerimdonggul Lava Tube, Mangjanggul Lava Tube, Gimnyeonggul Lava Tube, Yongcheondonggul Lava Tube, and Dangcheomuldonggul Lava Tube towards the sea. However, it is estimated that more tubes will be found. Bukoreumdonggul Lava Tube, Mangjanggul Lava Tube and Dangcheomuldonggul Lava are designated as natural monuments. Although these lava tubes are extremely large and ancient, the internal morphological features are well-preserved and the inner scenery is considered to be outstanding. As a result, "Jeju Volcanic Island and Lava Tubes" are UNESCO World Natural Heritage Sites.
Study results about the Geomunoreum Lava Tube System have been published in academic journals.

See also
World Heritage Sites in South Korea
Jeju Volcanic Island and Lava Tubes
Seongsan Ilchulbong
Hallasan
Jeju-do

References

Jeju Special Self-Governing Provincial Tourism Association

External links
Jeju Volcanic Island and Lava Tubes, UNESCO
Jeju Special Self-Governing Provincial Tourism Association
Jeju Special Self-Governing Province
Jeju World Natural Heritage

Lava tubes
Caves of Jeju Province